Hyas is a village in the Canadian province of Saskatchewan within the Rural Municipality of Clayton No. 333 and Census Division No. 9.

History 
Hyas incorporated as a village on May 23, 1919.

Demographics 

See also 

 List of communities in Saskatchewan
 Villages of Saskatchewan

References

External links

Villages in Saskatchewan
Clayton No. 333, Saskatchewan
Division No. 9, Saskatchewan